Frantic Flea is a Super Nintendo Entertainment System video game created by British studio Haüs Teknikka that was released in April 1996.

Gameplay

The player takes control of a flea warrior out to protect his Flea World from an evil race of bugs called the Insideos who are enslaving his friends and family.

This video game is a side-scroller with six different levels, where the player explores each stage, freeing fellow captive fleas and utilizing weapons and devices to aid in their missions. These weapons include the Hoverpod, which enables flight, and the Stikko, which can give the player the ability to climb walls.

Development
Andy Whitehurst, creative director of Haüs Teknikka, described the team's approach to the graphics: "What we were trying to show is that despite 16-bit graphical limitations you can actually make a video game look like a cartoon. We wanted FF to look like a '50s or '60s Warner Bros. cartoon and to have the same zany feel, almost Dr. Seuss-like which nobody has tried before in a video game."

Reception
The four reviewers of Electronic Gaming Monthly gave the game a 5.875 out of 10. Three of the four commented that though the game has some innovative features, they are not enough to hold the player's interest. They also criticized that losing all the player's collected fleas each time said player is hit is more frustrating than fun, and that the levels quickly grow repetitive. The remaining reviewer, Sushi-X, defended the game, praising its compelling action, graphics, and selection of weapons. A review in GamePro said the game "puts another nail in the Super NES coffin with uninteresting gameplay, horrible cartoon-like graphics, obnoxious and monotonous music, and annoying, imprecise controls. Basically all you do in this game is run around and collect your little flea buddies."

References

1996 video games
Fleas
GameTek games
Slavery in fiction
Fictional slaves
Video games about slavery
North America-exclusive video games
Platform games
Side-scrolling video games
Single-player video games
Super Nintendo Entertainment System games
Super Nintendo Entertainment System-only games
Video games about insects
Video games developed in the United Kingdom